Big Bang members have all released solo material since their debut album Bigbang Vol. 1, which included solo songs from each member. Four members: G-Dragon, Taeyang, Daesung, and Seungri have held solo concert tours. In 2008, Taeyang became the first member to hold a solo concert in support of his debut EP, Hot. In 2009, G-Dragon held his first concert, Shine a Light, in support of his debut album Heartbreaker. In 2010, Taeyang held his second concert in support of his first studio album Solar.

In March 2013, Daesung embarked on his debut concert tour in support of his debut Japanese-language album D'scover, while G-Dragon began his first world tour, The One of a Kind World Tour, which visited nine countries across Asia. From 2014 to 2015, Daesung and Taeyang both embarked on concert tours in support of their respective albums. Daesung's D'slove Tour visited eight cities in Japan while Taeyang's Rise World Tour visited nine Asian countries. In 2017, all three members embarked on solo tours after the success of BigBang's third studio album Made and its tour of the same name. Daesung held his first Japanese dome tour which consisted of two shows each at Seibu Prince Dome and Kyocera Dome. On his Act III: M.O.T.T.E World Tour, G-Dragon visited 29 cities across Asia, North America, Europe, and Oceania, becoming the first Korean solo artist to stage an arena tour in the latter three continents. G-Dragon also became the second Korean soloist to perform at the Tokyo Dome. Taeyang's White Night World Tour visited 19 cities across Asia and North America.

While T.O.P has never held a solo concert, he has held solo fan meetings in Japan in 2014. In 2017, Seungri held a fan meeting in Macau as a birthday party.

G-Dragon

Taeyang

Daesung

Seungri

See also
 List of Big Bang concert tours

References

External links
 G-Dragon Official website
 Taeyang Official website
 Daesung Official website 
 Daesung Official website 

Tours
 
Lists of concert tours
Lists of concert tours of South Korean artists
Lists of events in South Korea
South Korean music-related lists